Lectionary 263, designated by siglum ℓ 263 (in the Gregory-Aland numbering), is a Greek manuscript of the New Testament, on parchment. Palaeographically it has been assigned to the 12th century.
Scrivener labelled it as 193e,
Gregory by 158e. The manuscript has complex contents.

Description 

The codex contains lessons from the Gospel of John, Matthew, and Luke (Evangelistarium).

The text is written in Greek large minuscule letters, on 210 parchment leaves, in two columns per page, 22 lines per page. The initial letters are rubricated; it contains musical notes.

The manuscript contains weekday Gospel lessons from Easter to Pentecost and Saturday/Sunday Gospel lessons for the other weeks.

History 

Gregory dated the manuscript to the 13th century. It has been assigned by the Institute for New Testament Textual Research to the 12th century.

The manuscript was added to the list of New Testament manuscripts by Scrivener (number 193e) and Gregory (number 263e). Gregory saw the manuscript in 1885.

The manuscript is not cited in the critical editions of the Greek New Testament (UBS3).

The codex is housed at the Bibliothèque municipale de Besançon (Ms. 45) in Besançon.

See also 

 List of New Testament lectionaries
 Biblical manuscript
 Textual criticism

Notes and references

Bibliography 

 

Greek New Testament lectionaries
12th-century biblical manuscripts